The 1912 Purdue Boilermakers football team was an American football team that represented Purdue University during the 1912 college football season. In their third season under head coach Bill Horr, the Boilermakers compiled a 4–2–1 record, finished in third place in the Western Conference with a 2–2–1 record against conference opponents, and outscored their opponents by a total of 176 to 70. Robert R. Hutchison was the team captain.

Schedule

References

Purdue
Purdue Boilermakers football seasons
Purdue Boilermakers football